Astacidae is a family of freshwater crayfish native to Europe and western North America. The family is made up of four extant (living) genera: The genera Astacus (which includes the European crayfish), Pontastacus (which includes the Turkish crayfish), and Austropotamobius are all found throughout Europe and parts of western Asia, while Pacifastacus is found on the Pacific coast of the United States and British Columbia and includes the signal crayfish and the Shasta crayfish.

Classification and Phylogeny
Astacidae belongs to the superfamily Astacoidea, which contains all crayfish in the Northern Hemisphere. Astacoidea is the sister taxon to Parastacoidea, which contains all crayfish of the Southern Hemisphere. Crayfish and lobsters together comprise the infraorder Astacidea, as shown in the simplified cladogram below:

The internal phylogeny of Astacidae can be further shown in the cladogram below:

Species
The family Astacidae contains the following genera and species:

Astacus Fabricius, 1775
Astacus astacus (Linnaeus, 1775) - Europe - "European crayfish"
Astacus balcanicus (Karaman, 1929) - Republic of Macedonia and Greece
Astacus colchicus Kessler, 1876 - Georgia (country)
?Astacus edwardsii Van Straelen, 1928 - France - proposed to new genus Emplastron in 2021 study
Astacus laevissimus Fritsch & Kafka, 1887 - Czech Republic
Astacus multicavatus Bell, 1863 - United Kingdom
Austropotamobius Skorikov, 1907
Austropotamobius fulcisianus (Ninni, 1886) - southern Europe (Italy, Croatia, Switzerland, Austria)
Austropotamobius llopisi (Via, 1971) - Spain
Austropotamobius pallipes (Lereboullet, 1858) - France - "white-clawed crayfish"
Austropotamobius torrentium (von Paula Schrank, 1803) - Germany, Croatia, Macedonia - "stone crayfish"
Emplastron O'Flynn, Audo & Kawai, 2021
Emplastron edwardsi (Van Straelen, 1928) - Sézanne, France - Paleocene (Thanetian)
Pacifastacus Bott, 1950
Pacifastacus chenoderma (Cope, 1871) - Idaho, USA
Pacifastacus connectens (Faxon, 1914) - Idaho, USA
Pacifastacus fortis (Faxon, 1914) - California, USA - "Shasta crayfish"
Pacifastacus gambelii (Girard, 1852) - California, USA
Pacifastacus leniusculus (Dana, 1852) - Columbia River, west coast of North America - "signal crayfish"
Pacifastacus nigrescens (Stimpson, 1857) - around San Francisco, California, USA - "sooty crayfish" (recently extinct)
Pontastacus Bott, 1950
Pontastacus cubanicus (Birstein & Vinogradov, 1934) - Black Sea, Russia
Pontastacus danubialis Brodsky, 1981 - Danube Delta lakes, Ukraine
Pontastacus daucinus Brodsky, 1981 - Danube Delta lakes, Ukraine and Moldova
Pontastacus eichwaldi (Bott, 1950) - Caspian Sea
Pontastacus kessleri (Schimkewitsch, 1886) - Turkestan
Pontastacus leptodactylus (Eschscholtz, 1823) - around the Black Sea, in Crimea, Russia, and Turkey - "Turkish crayfish"
Pontastacus pachypus (Rathke, 1837) - Caspian Sea, Black Sea, Sea of Azov - "Caspian crayfish"
Pontastacus pylzowi (Skorikov, 1907) - eastern part of Transcaucasia
Pontastacus salinus (von Nordmann, 1842) - Black Sea

References

 
Crayfish
Decapod families
Taxa named by Pierre André Latreille